Massimo Donati (born 18 January 1967) is an Italian former professional racing cyclist. He rode in four editions of the Tour de France and one edition of the Giro d'Italia.

Major results

1999
 Gran Premio Città di Camaiore
 Coppa Ugo Agostoni

2001
 Giro del Lazio

Major competition results

References

External links
 

1967 births
Living people
Italian male cyclists
Cyclists from Tuscany
Sportspeople from the Province of Pisa